The 2012 Imola Superbike World Championship round was the second round of the 2012 Superbike World Championship season and of the 2012 Supersport World Championship season. It took place over the weekend of 30 March–1 April 2012 at the Autodromo Enzo e Dino Ferrari near Imola, Italy.

Superbike

Race 1 classification

Race 2 classification

Supersport

Race classification

External links
 The official website of the Superbike World Championship

Imola Superbike World Championship
Imola